Oberea neavei is a species of beetle in the family Cerambycidae. It was described by Per Olof Christopher Aurivillius in 1914.

Subspecies
 Oberea neavei tangana Breuning, 1974
 Oberea neavei neavei Aurivillius, 1914

References

Beetles described in 1914
neavei